Sanaz Mazinani (born 1978) is an Iranian–born Canadian multidisciplinary visual artist, curator and educator, known for her photography and installation art. She is currently based in San Francisco and Toronto.

Biography

Early life 
Mazinani was born in Tehran, Iran in 1978, one year prior to the Iranian Revolution. Her brother is artist Mani Mazinani. She immigrated to Canada at the age of 11. While in Canada, Mazinani studied at the Ontario College of Art and Design (currently known as OCAD University), where she graduated in 2003. She later moved to the United States in 2009. She received her Master of Fine Arts at Stanford University in 2011.

Artwork 
Throughout her practice, Sanaz Mazinani has produced an interconnected body of work. From the early stages, Mazinani has been concerned with two different but connected aspects of the image; the construction of images, and our mediated notion of the world through the constructed image. A Study in the Vertical (2002–2003) is an example of an early attempt at understanding the medium of photography and the production of images. In this work without the use of a negative she exposes the photographic colour paper to light using an enlarger in the darkroom. The results are camera-less abstract images without referents. In her later bodies of work Mazinani has continued asking the viewer to consider how the image is made and represented.

Mazinani's sensibility towards war, how we come to understand conflict and its politics through images and media has resulted in numerous works where she uses pre-existing, archival, and found images to digitally produce abstractions that without attentive observation would appear as ornamentations seen in Islamic art and architecture. Room for Disruption (2011) is an installation made of various components and not limited to the printed photograph; incorporating video, wallpaper, and sculptural elements mixed with images. She creates wall mounted photographic sculptures that protrude and in turn bend our field of vision. These structures usually provide both a central point inviting the audience to look closer, and an expanding geometric field that requires engagement from afar. Making visual juxtapositions, Mazinani challenges the viewer to look at photographs differently. This is best exemplified in Frames of the Visible (2011–2013) produced entirely by images gathered from online media sources.  These works often collocate images from opposing political poles in an attempt to question our understanding of conflict, military censorship, circulation and proliferation of information. For instance, when observing one of the pieces from a distance it is physically reminiscent of an aircraft and at the same time that of an Islamic ornamentation. Once looked at closely one realizes that it is a constellation of two images mirrored, cropped, and repeated in various orientations; a propaganda image of an armed Muslim woman with Hamas banners placed beside an image of a U.S.A. military pilot inspecting a fighter jet.

Mazinani's structuralist approach can be seen as an attempt to scrutinize media by subverting how one perceives images. As characterized in When We Start to Love War (2010), many of her works borrow images that have been filtered through Western sources, but nevertheless are all symptomatic of the East-West dichotomy.  Through this methodological approach Mazinani's installations speak back to the dizzying politics behind the global use/abuse of the instrumental visual language of images and simultaneously enable the viewer to be a part of this dialogue.

Notable projects include: Bay Area Activism, 2013; Site, Sight, and Insight, 2013; Conference of the Birds, 2012; Frames of the Visible, 2011–2013; Room for Disruption, 2011; When We Start to Love War, 2010; Iran Revisited, 1999–2013.

Unfolding Images, published by Bulger Gallery Press in April 2012 and co-authored by Jeremiah Barber, David Fresko and Mohammadreza Mirzaei.

Exhibitions

Mazinani's art works have been included in numerous exhibitions throughout North America, Europe and Asia. Notable group exhibitions include Twisted Sisters: Reimagining Urban Portraiture at the Museum Bärengasse, Zurich, Switzerland and San Francisco City Hall. Organized by the San Francisco Arts Commission and curated by Alexandra Blättler and San Francisco Arts Commission Gallery Director, Meg Shiffler; Magic of Persia Contemporary Art Prize 2013 Exhibition at the Emirates Financial Towers in Dubai, United Arab Emirates; Sarai Reader 09 Festival, New Delhi, India Border Cultures, curated by Srimoyee Mitra at the Art Gallery of Windsor, Windsor, Canada, which won the Ontario Association of Art Galleries exhibit of the year award; Shadow Puppets: Traces of New Documentary Practices at the Welch School Galleries, curated by Jill Frank and Stephanie Dowda for the Georgia State University; and Occupy Bay Area, at the Yerba Buena Center for the Arts in San Francisco, California; Signal to Noise, SF Camerawork, San Francisco, California. 	

Significant solo exhibitions include: Sight, Site, and Insight at Gallery 44 Center for Contemporary Photography in 2013 which was accompanied by an exhibition catalogue written by Rosemary Heather; Celebrating Bay Area Activism, a series of six photo-collage works installed in 36 bus kiosks along Market Street in San Francisco, as part of the SFAC Art on Market Street Public Art program; Frames of the Visible in 2012 at Stephen Bulger Gallery in Toronto, Canada, as a featured exhibition in the Scotiabank CONTACT Photography Festival, and U.S.A.I.R.A.N (2014), a public art installation that activates a vacant space by covering all its windows with a set of twenty-one digital montages;Signal to Noise in 2017 at the San Francisco Camerawork Gallery in San Francisco, California; Light Times in 2019 at both the Stephen Bulger Gallery, and the Triton Museum of Art in Santa Clara, California.

Awards

Mazinani has been awarded grants from the Canada Council (2013), the San Francisco Arts Commission Cultural Equity Grant (2013), as well as awards from Stanford University, Ontario Arts Council, and the Toronto Arts Council for the development and creation of her projects. Mazinani was named a 2012 Kala Art Institute Fellow. She was awarded the SFAC Art on Market Street commission for the project Celebrating Bay Area Activism.

Curation

Mazinani's recent curatorial projects included three exhibitions created for the Tirgan biennial festival in Toronto in 2013. These included Made in China, an outdoor art installation by Tehran-based artist Negar Farajiani, Hope Echoed, an exhibition of portraits of Iranian women by Toronto's lively arts community, and The Third Space, a three-month exhibition featuring works by six Iranian artists held at the York Quay Gallery in Toronto's Harbourfront Centre The exhibition focused on the hybrid identities that result from life in the diaspora and received much acclaim.

Other curatorial projects have included, Visions of Eternity (2011), including works by Abbas Akhavan, Reza Derakshani, Parastou Forouhar, Oldouz Moslemian, Taimaz Moslemian, Nasser Ovissi, Hamed Sahihi, Soody Sharifi, and Ali Soltani; New Constellations: Contemporary Iranian Video Art, with colleague Amirali Ghasemi; Off World, an interactive site-specific outdoor installation with Andrew Mallis and Mateo Guez, and ALMANAC: An Index of Current Work and Thought, a collaborative publication addressing the relationship between theory and practice, The Death of Photography (Bulger Gallery Press, 2008).

See also 

 List of Iranian women artists

References

External links
Sanaz Maziniani's Website
Sanaz Mazinani exhibition, Threshold (2015), at Asian Art Museum of San Francisco

Living people
1978 births
21st-century Canadian women artists
21st-century Iranian women artists
21st-century women photographers
Canadian installation artists
Canadian contemporary artists
Stanford University alumni
Artists from Ontario
Artists from the San Francisco Bay Area
Artists from California
OCAD University alumni
American artists of Iranian descent